Flagler College is a private liberal arts college in St. Augustine, Florida. It was founded in 1968 and offers 33 undergraduate majors and one master's program. It also has a campus in Tallahassee.

History 
Founded in 1968, the campus comprises , the centerpiece of which is the Ponce de León Hotel, built in 1888 as a luxury hotel. The architects were John Carrere and Thomas Hastings, working for Henry Morrison Flagler, the industrialist, oil magnate and railroad pioneer. It is now listed as a National Historic Landmark, the highest designation possible.

Lawrence Lewis Jr., was the driving force behind Flagler's development. It was his vision to create a small, private liberal arts college on the old hotel grounds. Lewis was Chairman of Flagler's board of trustees for more than 20 years, guiding the college through a reorganization in 1971. He directed millions of dollars through foundations, family and personal funds into new construction, restoration projects, endowment and various other programs to ensure Flager's continued success. Lewis was related to Henry Flagler through his mother, Louise Wise Lewis Francis, who was the niece of Mary Lily Kenan Flagler, who married Henry Flagler in 1901 making him Lewis' great uncle.

In 2014, Flagler College was ranked eighth among regional colleges in the South according to the U.S. News & World Report college survey. 

In February 2014, the college's vice president of enrollment management resigned after it was determined that he had been altering student test scores, GPAs, and student rankings to enhance the college's image, standing, and reputation. The college hired a Jacksonville law firm to investigate. The report indicated that the college had been reporting false information since 2004 to various organizations, including the U.S. Department of Education and various ranking organizations.

Proctor Library

The Proctor Library, located at 44 Sevilla Street in the northwest corner of campus, is Flagler's sole library facility. It is named after William L. Proctor, Flagler's chancellor, who was president of the college from 1971 until 2001. Like many of the historic buildings on campus, the Proctor Library's architectural design reflects the Gilded Age style popular during the time of Henry Flagler's construction of the Ponce de León Hotel in 1888. The Proctor Library was built in 1996, replacing the demolished home of artist Felix de Crano, which had been the last classic Shingle Style house in St. Augustine.

The library's collection contains approximately 102,047 printed volumes, 212,689 electronic books, 4,180 audiovisual items, 630 periodicals, and 5 newspapers, as well as almost 44,000 full-text electronic periodicals and 50 online databases. Proctor Library also contains three collections: Digital Collections, Flagler College Archives, and Special Collections. Access to, and the use of, the Proctor Library is limited to Flagler College students, faculty, and staff, and is not open to the general public without a written request. Proctor Library Digital Collections, however, is accessible to anyone with an Internet connection.

Student life

Organizations
Flagler offers membership in 11 honor societies, including Alpha Chi, Alpha Psi Omega, Alpha Phi Sigma, Sigma Beta Delta, Pi Sigma Alpha, Kappa Delta Pi, Omicron Delta Kappa, Phi Alpha Theta, Psi Chi, Alpha Kappa Delta, and Sigma Tau Delta. In addition, there are 3 student organizations, 30 campus clubs, and 9 academic organizations. Flagler also has 6 sports clubs, including club hockey, dance club, men's lacrosse club, men's soccer club, winter guard, and a Quidditch team.

Newspaper
The Gargoyle is the college's student-run newspaper. In 2010, it went online-only. At the 2012 Society of Professional Journalists' Mark of Excellence Region 3 awards, The Gargoyle took first place for best independent online publication and first places for editor Michael Newberger in online opinion writing and sports editor Mari Pothier in online sports reporting.

Since becoming online-only, The Gargoyle has won nine Regional Mark of Excellence awards and published three more from Flagler Communication Department classes. Before 2010, the publication had only won two SPJ awards in its history. In 2007, the publication was a finalist in the Associated Collegiate Press Pacemaker Awards.

In 2006 and 2007, there were several allegations of censorship or alteration of articles in the Gargoyle by the college administration. In 2006, one issue of the newspaper was removed from circulation due to an alleged error in its headlines about rising tuition. In April 2007, the college administration again exercised editorial control over the paper due to alleged factual errors. Students rallied and organized a protest against any type of censorship of the newspaper, calling for a free and independent student press.

After September 2007, working on The Gargoyle was no longer required of communication majors. An advisory board and operating guidelines were set up for The Gargoyle.

Athletics 

The Flagler athletic teams are called the Saints. The college is a member of the NCAA Division II ranks, primarily competing in the Peach Belt Conference (PBC) since the 2009–10 academic year. The Saints previously competed as an NCAA D-II Independent from 2006–07 to 2008–09; and in the Florida Sun Conference (FSC; now currently known as the Sun Conference since the 2008–09 school year) of the National Association of Intercollegiate Athletics (NAIA) from 1990–91 to 2005–06.

Flagler competes in 19 intercollegiate varsity sports: Men's sports include baseball, basketball, cross country, golf, lacrosse, soccer, tennis and track & field (indoor); while women's sports include basketball, cross country, golf, lacrosse, soccer, softball, tennis, track & field (indoor) and volleyball. There are also two spirit squad teams: cheerleading and pep band.

Volleyball
In 2009 the Flagler College Lady Saints volleyball team made it to the national championship, and finished in the top four of Division II volleyball teams in the nation. In 2010, the Lady Saints made it to the regional finals, finishing top 16 in the nation.

Notable alumni
 Laura Croft, model
 Linda Evans, science fiction writer
 Scott Lagasse Jr., NASCAR driver
 Greg Lake, Florida radio personality
 Ariana Madix, star of Vanderpump Rules
 Robert Reyes, Filipino-American professional basketball player
 Marco Warren, Bermuda national football team
 Kyle Bird, MLB player for the Hiroshima Carp

Gallery

See also

Flagler College – Tallahassee Campus
Independent Colleges and Universities of Florida

References

External links

 
 Official athletics website

 
Educational institutions established in 1968
Universities and colleges accredited by the Southern Association of Colleges and Schools
St. Augustine, Florida
Liberal arts colleges in Florida
Tourist attractions in St. Augustine, Florida
Education in St. Johns County, Florida
Universities and colleges in the Jacksonville metropolitan area
1968 establishments in Florida
Private universities and colleges in Florida